3 Dev is an unreleased Indian Hindi-language comedy film written and directed by Ankoosh Bhatt. The film stars Karan Singh Grover, Kunaal Roy Kapur, Ravi Dubey, Tisca Chopra and Raima Sen in the prominent roles while Prosenjit Chatterjee and Kay Kay Menon in the supportive roles. The film is bankrolled by Chitan Rana of R2 Phillum Productions and cinematography for the film is handled by Soni Singh. The Bollywood musical duo Sajid–Wajid will compose and score music for the film.

Cast 

 Karan Singh Grover as Vishnu
 Kunaal Roy Kapur as Mahesh/Shiva
 Ravi Dubey as Brahma
 Priya Banerjee as Vani
 Poonam Kaur as Radha
 Raima Sen as Bhairavi
 Kay Kay Menon as Shanu/Satyavan
 Tisca Chopra as Savitri
 Prosenjit Chatterjee as Professor
 Pooja Bose as an item number "Ban Dance Mein Kutta"

Production 
The film titled as 3 Dev depicts and implies the three main gods in Hinduism namely Vishnu, Brahma and Shiva. The tagline of the film is Undercover Bhagwan. The role of Vishnu is played by Karan Singh Grover, the role of Brahma is played by Ravi Dubey and the role of Shiva is played by Kunaal Roy Kapur in the film. The first look poster of the film was unveiled on 27 March 2018 by Varun Dhawan.

Marketing 
The official trailer of the film was released on 27 April 2018 and the filmmakers initially confirmed the film release date on 11 May 2018, but was not released.

Soundtrack 
All songs of the film were scored by duo Sajid–Wajid and lyrics are penned by Kausar Munir, Shabbir Ahmed, and Amitabh Bhattacharya.

References

External links 
 
 

Unreleased Hindi-language films
Indian comedy-drama films
Films scored by Sajid–Wajid
Hindi-language comedy films
Hinduism in popular culture